Katrine Madsen (born 7 March 1972 in Aarhus, Denmark) is a Danish jazz singer.

Biography 
Madsen studied at the Royal Danish Academy of Music and has worked in Copenhagen on albums with transplanted American jazz artists Ed Thigpen and Richard Boone.

In 2002, she founded the Katrine Madsen Sextet and gave their debut concert at the Copenhagen Jazz Festival.

Discography

Solo albums 
 1996: I'm Old Fashioned (Mecca Records)
 1997: Dream Dancing (Mecca Records)
 1998: You Are So Beautiful (Mecca Records), with Ed Thigpen Trio
 2000: My Secret (Mecca Records), quartet feat. Lars Møller
 2002: Magic Night (Mecca Records), with Bohuslän Big Band 
 2004: Close To You (Stunt Records), with Stefano Bollani, Jesper Bodilsen, and Morten Lund
 2006: Supernatural Love (Stunt Records), with Ulf Wakenius
 2009: Simple Life (Stunt Records), with Joakim Milder, Henrik Gunde Pedersen, Jesper Bodilsen, Jonas Johansen, Morten Lund, and Ole Kibsgaard

Collaborations 
 1999: A Tribute To Love (Stunt Records), with Richard B. Boone
 2000: Edderkoppen Soundtrack
 2002: Gershwin & More (Mecca Records), with Baker Boys
 2002: Live in Stockholm (Music Mecca), with Svante Thuresson
 2003: We Are Povo, with POVO
 2005: Box Of Pearls (Stunt Records), with Svante Thuresson

References

External links 

1972 births
Living people
20th-century Danish women singers
Danish jazz singers
Royal Danish Academy of Music alumni
21st-century Danish women singers